Morphogenetic robotics  generally refers to the methodologies that address challenges in robotics inspired by biological morphogenesis.

Background

Differences to epigenetic 
Morphogenetic robotics is related to, but differs from, epigenetic robotics. The main difference between morphogenetic robotics and epigenetic robotics is that the former focuses on self-organization, self-reconfiguration, self-assembly and self-adaptive control of robots using genetic and cellular mechanisms inspired from biological early morphogenesis (activity-independent development), during which the body and controller of the organisms are developed simultaneously, whereas the latter emphasizes the development of robots' cognitive capabilities, such as language, emotion and social skills, through experience during the lifetime (activity-dependent development). Morphogenetic robotics is closely connected to developmental biology and systems biology, whilst epigenetic robotics is related to developmental cognitive neuroscience emerged from cognitive science, developmental psychology and neuroscience.

Topics 
Morphogenetic robotics includes, but is not limited to the following main topics:
 "Morphogenetic swarm robotics" deals with the self-organization of multi-robots using genetic and cellular mechanisms governing the biological early morphogenesis;
 "Morphogenetic modular robots" are when modular robots adapt their configuration autonomously using morphogenetic principles;
 "Developmental approaches" deals with the design of the body plan of robots, such as sensors and actuators, as well as the design of the controller, e.g., a neural controller using a generative coding  gene regulatory network model.

See also
Artificial life
Cognitive robotics
Developmental robotics
Evolutionary robotics
Evolutionary developmental robotics
Modular design

References

External links
A website on Morphogenetic Robotics maintained by Prof. Yaochu Jin
EC FP7 Project: SWARM-ORGAN
European Projects: Symbiotic Evolutionary Robot Organisms (SYMBRION)and Robotic Evolutionary Self-Programming and Self-Assembling Organisms (REPLICATOR)
Laboratory of Intelligent Systems of Prof. Dario Floriano
Cornell Computational Synthesis Laboratory of Prof. Hod Lipson
Dynamic and Evolutionary Machine Organization Lab of Prof. John Pollack

Robotics
Modular design